Swapnalokathe Balabhaskaran is a 1996 Indian Malayalam-language comedy-drama film directed by Rajasenan, starring Jayaram and Annie Shaji Kailas.

Plot
Balabhaskaran suffers from somnambulism. He walks long distances in the night and many mishaps happen because of this. He is blamed for a murder by his friend Johnnie, who wants to extort some money from Balabhaskaran by blackmailing him. Balabhaskaran's father marries him off to Chandrika in the hope that this will help him to get over his sleepwalking.

Later, Balabhaskaran is involved in an accident and believing he was on his death bed, tells Chandrika that he was living the life of a womanizer before marriage. Luckily, or unluckily, Balabhaskaran survives, but Chandrika is not willing to forget what he told her about his previous life. This creates problems in their married life.

Cast 
Jayaram as Balabhaskaran
Annie as Chandrika
Dileep as Kesavankutty
Paravoor Ramachandran as Kaimal 
K.P.A.C. Lalitha as Bhageerathi 
Janardhanan as Sadasivan 
Indrans as Kunjunni
Anju Aravind as Mohini  
Madhupal as Johnnie 
Zeenath as Sadasivan's wife
Krishna Prasad as Manoj 
K. T. S. Padannayil   
Baburaj
Kozhikode Narayanan Nair as Chandrashekhara Kaimal

References

External links
 

1990s Malayalam-language films
1996 films
1996 romantic comedy films
Films directed by Rajasenan
Indian romantic comedy films